Nuneaton Borough Football Club is an English association football club based in Nuneaton, Warwickshire. The club participates in the Conference National, the fifth tier of English football.

In 1889 Nuneaton St. Nicholas were the first team to play senior football within Nuneaton. Five years later they changed their name to Nuneaton Town, and played until 1937 when the club was disbanded. However, two days later Nuneaton Borough F.C. were founded but in 1991, the club ran into financial difficulties and were renamed Nuneaton Borough AFC. In 2008 the club was liquidated, and were reformed as Nuneaton Town – suffering a two division demotion. The club is still known as 'The Boro' by locals and by those who support the team. The club play their home fixtures at Liberty Way in their home kit of blue & white vertical stripes.

Key
P = Games played
W = Games won
D = Games drawn
L = Games lost
F = Goals for
A = Goals against
GD = Goal difference
Pts = Points

Seasons

References

English football club seasons